The Police Cantonment Complex (PCC) is a high-rise government complex located on 391 New Bridge Road, Singapore 088762, next to Outram Park MRT station. It was officially opened in July 2001.

Amenities and architecture
The design of the building integrates the varied operational requirements of the major offices to create a modern, efficient and user-friendly environment. Each department block has its own distinct identity and yet when viewed together, project a uniform identity.

The semi-circular structure at the corner depicts a soaring bird's wing.

The energy-efficient aluminium and glass curtain-wall, intelligent building management system, document conveying system and central vacuum system are some of the unique features of the main complex.

The complex consists of four blocks of building and consists of a 25-storey tower with 6 to 9-storey podium blocks and a 4-storey basement for parking, services and operational areas. Block A houses the Central Police Division, together with the Bukit Merah East Neighbourhood Police Centre. Block B houses the Central Narcotics Bureau (CNB), while the Criminal Investigation Department (CID) is located in Block C and the Commercial Affairs Department (CAD) in Block D. Located on the second floor of Block D are the Certificate of No Criminal Conviction (CNCC) Office, Record Office, Police Welfare Division and Licensing Division.

The complex is guarded with armed Aetos Auxiliary police officers and vehicle access roads have tank barriers to protect the building.

References

2001 establishments in Singapore
Singapore Police Force
Police stations in Singapore
Skyscraper office buildings in Singapore
Government buildings completed in 2001
Bukit Merah
Buildings and structures in Central Region, Singapore